Carlos Muñiz Varela (August 10, 1953 – April 28, 1979) was a Cuban resident of Puerto Rico who was murdered under suspicious circumstances in 1979. Muñiz Varela was an outspoken backer of the Puerto Rican independence movements.

Biography
Muñiz Varela was born in Cuba. When he was nine years old, he moved from Cuba together with his mother and sister to live in Puerto Rico.

Muñiz Varela received his primary and secondary education in Puerto Rico and in 1973, he formed the Movimiento Socialista Popular, a university students pro-independence group. In 1974, Muñiz Varela joined the staff of Areito magazine, a pro-Puerto Rican independence publication. In 1977, Muñiz Varela returned to Cuba, this time as a reporter for Areito, and there, he interviewed various political leaders.

Late in the 1970s, Muñiz Varela and a business associate opened a travel agency named Varadero Travel in Bayamon, near San Juan. This agency aimed at making traveling between Puerto Rico and Cuba, and back, easier for Cuban exiles in Puerto Rico. On December 21, 1978, Muñiz Varela and 90 other Cubans flew to Cuba in what is believed to be the first time since the Cuban revolution that a group of Cubans visited the island from Puerto Rico. During this trip, Muñiz met Edith Cabrera, a divorced TV soap opera actress, and they were soon romantically involved, even though she knew that he was married. In a court-ordered deposition, Cabrera acknowledged their romance lasted until his death and that Muñiz had proposed marriage to her since he was separated from his wife Pilar Perez Negron. Two weeks before his death, Muñiz called Cabrera from Havana and asked her to take petty cash from the travel agency and rent a furnished studio apartment for him in the Villamar neighborhood of Isla Verde. Cabrera also testified that Muñiz carried a handgun and on the morning of his death she took him from the studio apartment to his office. They made a dinner date for 6:00 pm that evening but she never heard from him again.

Death
Muñiz Varela was murdered on April 28, 1979, as he was driving to his mother's house in Guaynabo, a city that borders Bayamon, San Juan and Caguas. He received two shots, one in the chest near his left shoulder and another on the temple, the latter one of which exited his head towards his left ear. The mortally wounded Muñiz Varela was taken to the Centro Medico hospital. When his lover Edith Cabrera went there to see him, his friends told her to leave "to avoid problems" because the wife Pilar Perez Negron was present. When Cabrera attended the burial at the cemetery she was the last in the crowd.

A group which called itself "Comando Cero" took credit for the assassination but Muñiz Varela's murder was never solved.  The investigation into his death was given renewed attention under the mandate of Wanda Vázquez Garced, the governor of Puerto Rico in 2019.

Allegations
Muñiz Varela's death caused a large amount of allegations, both political and personal. A local Puerto Rican newspaper, the PNP backed "La Crónica", declared Muñiz Varela to be a drug-dealing communist in April 1984.

On the other hand, documents that were declassified by the FBI in 2012 linked Cuban exile Julio Labatud, also known as "Julito Labatud", as being involved in the murder of Muñiz Varela. Labatud, who lived in Puerto Rico for 40 years, died in 2007 of cancer.

Personal
Muñiz Varela was married twice. He had a son, Carlos Muñiz Perez, (Carlos Muñiz Jr.) and a daughter, Yamaira Muñiz Perez.

See also

Cerro Maravilla murders
Filiberto Ojeda Rios
List of Puerto Ricans
List of unsolved murders

Fellow Cuban expatriates in Puerto Rico
Luis Aguad Jorge
Marilyn Pupo
Nobel Vega
Rosaura Andreu

References

1953 births
1979 murders in Puerto Rico
1979 deaths
Assassinated Puerto Rican people
Cuban emigrants to Puerto Rico
Cuban expatriates in Puerto Rico
Cuban male writers
Cuban reporters and correspondents
Male murder victims
People from Bayamón, Puerto Rico
People murdered in Puerto Rico
Unsolved murders in Puerto Rico
Cuban people murdered abroad